The South Region was a region that competed in the Little League World Series between 1957 and 2000 until it was split into the Southwest and Southeast regions in 2001.  

The South Region was inaugurated in 1957.   The Region originally consisted of teams from Alabama, Arkansas, Delaware, Florida, Georgia, Louisiana, Maryland, Mississippi, North Carolina, Oklahoma, South Carolina, Tennessee, Texas, Virginia, and West Virginia.  In 1957, the Industrial Little League of Monterrey, Mexico won the South Region championship before Latin America was given its own berth starting with the 1958 LLWS. In 1968, Delaware and Maryland moved to the East Region.  In 2000, Oklahoma replaced Kentucky in the region for one year before the region split into two.  The tournament was held in Saint Petersburg, Florida each year between 1972 and 2000.

Little League Baseball expanded the LLWS to sixteen teams for the 2001 Little League World Series.  The South Region was split into the Southeast region – Alabama, Florida, Georgia, North Carolina, South Carolina, Tennessee, Virginia, and West Virginia – and the Southwest region – Arkansas, Louisiana, Mississippi, Oklahoma, Texas East, and Texas West, plus West Region teams Colorado and New Mexico.

South Region Champions (1957–2000)

The following table indicates the South Region champion and its LLWS performance in each year between 1957 and 2000.

Results by State

References

External links
Little League Online
South Region Historical Results

South
Defunct baseball competitions in the United States
Sports in the Southern United States